

A
Alfa Brouwerij, Schinnen
Amstel Brouwerij, Amsterdam

B
Bavaria Brouwerij, Lieshout
Brand Brewery, Wijlre
Brouwerij 't IJ, Amsterdam

D
Dommelsch, Dommelen

G
Grolsch, Enschede
Gulpener Bierbrouwerij, Gulpen

H
Heineken, Zoeterwoude, Den Bosch
Hertog Jan, Arcen

J
Jopen, Haarlem

K
Brouwerij De Koningshoeven, Berkel-Enschot

M
Brouwerij De Molen, Bodegraven

O
Oranjeboom, Breda

See also

 Beer and breweries by region

References

Netherlands
Lists of companies of the Netherlands